Rosa Maria "Rosemarie" Levy Sonora (born April 14, 1948) is a Filipina former actress.

Life
She was born to an American mother of French and Jewish extraction and a Filipino father of Spanish and Chinese Filipino descent. Her sister, Susan Roces, and her daughter, Sheryl Cruz, are also actresses.

She was billed as Rosemarie during her first film, Ulilang Anghel in 1958, and even during her heydays as a teen actress during the mid to late 60s. Most of her movie then were fantasy-comedy-musical flicks which were moneymakers like Juanita Banana (1968) and Rikkitik loves Rositik (1969) and a lot more. She became the princess of Sampaguita Pictures and one of the stars of Maraming Kulay ang Pag-ibig, co-starring with Loretta Marquez, Gina Pareño, Blanca Gomez, and Shirley Moreno.

During the early 70s, she had her weekly drama show, titled Rosemarie on ABS-CBN. She had to take a leave from show business when she gave birth to Wowie Cruz.

She was once married to actor Ricky Belmonte, they separated. She later married an American and resides in California, long retired from acting.

Filmography

Film
Ulilang Anghel (1958)
 Dance O Rama (1963)
Maraming Kulay ang Pag-ibig (1966)
Ikaw Ay Akin, Ako Ay sa Iyo (1968)
Juanita Banana (1968)
Rikkitik Loves Rositik (1969)
Gintong Alaala (1970)
The Young at Heart (1970)
First Kiss (1970)
Life Everlasting (1971)
Dearest, Forever... (1972)
Love Eternal (1972)
Binhi (1973)
The Manila Connection  (1974)
Nagbabagang Silangan (1975)
At Lumaganap ang Lagim (1975)
Hari sa Hari, Lahi sa Lahi (1987)
Campus Beat (1984)

Television
Rosemarie
Balintataw (Episode title: "Labinlimang Taon"; 1987)

References

External links

1948 births
20th-century Filipino actresses
ABS-CBN personalities
Actresses from Negros Occidental
Filipino child actresses
Filipino film actresses
Filipino people of American descent
Filipino people of Chinese descent
Filipino people of French descent
Living people
People from Bacolod